The white-necked heron or Pacific heron (Ardea pacifica) is a species of heron that is found on most of the Australian continent wherever freshwater habitats exist. It is also found in parts of Indonesia, New Guinea and New Zealand, but is uncommon in Tasmania. The populations of this species in Australia are known to be nomadic like most water birds in Australia, moving from one water source to another often entering habitats they have not previously occupied, taking advantage of flooding and heavy rain where the surplus of food allows them to breed and raise their young. Population explosions have been known when the environmental conditions are right for this species in places where they have been rare or unknown.

Description 
Large water dwelling bird, diurnal animal. Slate-grey to black with distinctive black spots in the centre of the lower fore-neck and throat. During breeding season plum coloured nuptial plumes are present on the back and breast.  Flight: stately, slow steady wing beats. Body size/length 76–106 cm, Wingspan 147–160 cm, weight 860g. 

The bill is black and the facial skin is commonly blue or yellow. In this species of heron the eyes are green and the legs and feet also being black. Elongated neck and beak designed to reach out and catch fish, frogs, spiders and any other food source available in its habitat. Most of the head and neck is white with the black spots on the neck only visible in non-breeding individuals.

In the downy young, down is longer especially on the crown of the head with the neck and head being white and the upper wing and upperparts being a light grey brown. When juvenile feathers appear they are a dark grey. In Juveniles a broad strip of grey black runs down the front of the neck. Head and neck are commonly a brownish-grey tinge. The adult feathers emerge after wear replaces the juvenile feathers.

Taxonomy 

Ardea pacifica : Latham, 1801

Distribution 

The white-necked heron is found throughout most of the Australian continent commonly residing in wetlands, tidal areas, shallow fresh waters, farm dams, clay pans, pastures and run off water in road side ditches.  The species has thrived since modifications were made to the Australian landscape through irrigation, dams and other man made water sources.

Not found in some parts of Western Australia and South Australia. Not found in arid zones, being the Great Sandy Desert, Gibson Desert, and Great Victoria Desert also the Nullarbor Plain.  Information regarding movement of this species is still unknown due to irruptive habits, which are commonly attributed to environmental conditions forcing the white-necked heron to act in a certain way, maintaining genetic adaptions to the harsh Australian environment in order to survive.

Ecology and habitat 
It has been suggested that the white-necked heron is a shy bird and very wary of its surrounds only keeping to areas where it has a clear view of what is around it. Commonly found in shallow wetlands usually seen foraging singly, also in pairs. Will defend feeding territories against other species aggressively. Observed harassing species of ibis (Threskiornis moluccus) and raptors, often stealing prey they have caught. When water sources dry up they fly to other water sources at an altitude of 30-100m. Habitat includes terrestrial wetlands and grasslands. Found where permanent water exists. The modified Australian landscape has favoured this species because they also commonly exist in farm dams and flooded pastures searching for prey. Babies start leaving the nest when they are  grown. When young are born the parents alternate shifts to shade the young with their wings to keep them cool. First flight is generally around 6–7 weeks of maturity.

Reproduction 

Nest is made from bulky materials (twigs and sticks about 1 cm-2 cm in diameter) very loosely constructed on a platform with a depression in the middle and usually measures 30 cm-60 cm across. Nests are commonly at a height of between 15m-30m above the ground on a tree structure associated with access to a close a food and water source. During breeding seasons males have been observed standing on or near the nest structure for very long periods, fiddling with nesting material, preening, and displaying himself. The male has also been observed displaying a dance of the following movements: starting at a normal stance, the bird brings its body into a horizontal position, throwing its head back nearly reaching the body. Stretching its head skyward and pumping its head three to four times over the course of a minute. With legs bent, exclaiming an "oomph" call or guttural croak. Breeding frequency is once a year. The bond between males and females of the species is assumed to be monogamous. Nesting season is September to December even as late as January. It has suggested eggs are incubated for 30 days before hatching. Eggs are light blue-green, measuring 53mm x 38mm. Clutch sizes usually consist of four eggs but as many as six have been known to occur. Breeding success rate is between 0.3 and 1.8 young to maturity, eggs incubated by both parents.

Diet 

Freshwater mussels, fish, shrimp, freshwater crayfish, spiders, dragonfly nymphs, damselflies, praying mantis, grasshoppers, water beetles, lizards, young ducklings, young freshwater rat, and amphibians. Young are fed with regurgitated tadpoles and will knock smaller young out of the nest in competition for the food source.

Predators 
Introduced red fox – Vulpes vulpes
Feral cat – Felis catus

Threats 
Secure existence in all states and territories of Australia.

Gallery

References

External links 
 BirdLife Species Factsheet

white-necked heron
white-necked heron
Birds of New Guinea
Birds of Indonesia
Birds of New Zealand
Endemic birds of Australia
white-necked heron